The Senate of Southern Ireland was the upper house of the Parliament of Southern Ireland, established de jure in 1921 under the terms of the Government of Ireland Act 1920. The Act stipulated that there be 64 senators, but only 39 were selected and the Senate met only twice before being dissolved: on 28 June and 13 July 1921 in the Council Room of the Department of Agriculture and Technical Instruction in Dublin.

Composition
The Senate's composition was specified in the Second Schedule of the 1920 act, and the mode and time of selection in the Fourth Schedule. These were similar to those suggested for the Senate in the report of the Irish Convention of 1917–18. The 64 members were as follows:
 3 ex officio members: 
 The Lord Chancellor of Ireland, intended as the presiding officer of the Senate. The Lord Chancellor had previously been the chairman of the Irish House of Lords in the Parliament of Ireland prior to its abolition.
 The Lord Mayor of Dublin and the Lord Mayor of Cork.
 17 "Representatives of Commerce (including Banking), Labour, and the Scientific and Learned Professions"  to be nominated by the Lord Lieutenant of Ireland for a term of 10 years.
 44 members elected by various interest groups: 
 Elected for a term of 10 years:
 4 Archbishops or Bishops of the Roman Catholic Church holding Sees situated wholly or partly in Southern Ireland.
 2 Archbishops or Bishops of the Church of Ireland holding Sees situated wholly or partly in Southern Ireland.
 16 Peers (not necessarily members of the Peerage of Ireland) who were taxpayers, or ratepayers in respect of property, and had residences, in Southern Ireland.
 8 members of the Privy Council of Ireland of no less than two years standing who were taxpayers or ratepayers in respect of property in and had residences in Southern Ireland.
 14 representatives of county councils, elected for a term of three years:
 4 from each of Leinster, Munster, and Connacht
 2 from the three Ulster counties not in Northern Ireland (Cavan, Donegal, and Monaghan)

Election and boycott
The election details were given by Orders in Council on 22 April 1921, which made the Clerk of the Crown and Hanaper the electoral registrar and returning officer. Elections would use single transferable vote, except that groups electing two senators used multiple non-transferable vote. Only electors of a given group could stand in that group's election, except for the county council groups.

Only 39 of the 64 senators were selected or elected. The Irish Republic declared by Sinn Féin in 1919 rejected the legitimacy of the 1920 act. Sinn Féin had gained control of the county councils in the 1920 local elections. Áine Ceannt as secretary of the General Council of County Councils wrote to the Dáil Ministry asking whether to participate.  Only W. T. Cosgrave favoured participation, on the basis that the republic's First Dáil had agreed to use the Southern Ireland Commons election to select the members of the Second Dáil. Other ministers favoured a boycott, both on the principle that the selection process was undemocratic, and on the pragmatic grounds that unionists would have a majority whereas a boycott would leave it inquorate. Accordingly, on 28 April 1921 Austin Stack as Minister for Home Affairs issued a proclamation ordering "that members of County Councils and other bodies who uphold the right of the Irish people to choose their own representatives and Government take no part in the partial election so proposed for the said Senate". The Irish Congress of Trade Unions and Labour Party supported the Republic, and the Catholic hierarchy also refused to co-operate. Of the incomplete membership, many had participated in the Irish Convention.

Of the 39 selected, 27 took the Parliamentary Oath of Allegiance, of whom 19 attended one of the two meetings. Fifteen attended the first and twelve the second, of whom eight attended both. Of the peers and privy councillors, 19 (all bar Cloncurry, Meath, and Westmeath) signed a letter refusing to act as a Senate if the elected Commons were replaced by an appointed "Crown Colony" assembly.

List

Supersession
In 1922, both the Irish Republic and Southern Ireland were superseded by the Irish Free State. Some of the Southern Ireland senators were subsequently senators in the Free State Seanad (upper house), either appointed by W. T. Cosgrave, President of the Executive Council, or elected by the members of the Dáil (lower house).

See also
Parliament of Southern Ireland.

References

Citations

 
Senate of Southern Ireland